Thysanoprymna pyrrhopyga is a moth of the family Erebidae. It was described by Francis Walker in 1865. It is found in Brazil and Ecuador.

References

Phaegopterina
Moths described in 1865